Alcides Vigo is a Peruvian football club, playing in the city of Lima.

History
The club was 1996 and 2001 Segunda División Peruana champion.

The club have played at the highest level of Peruvian football on one occasion, in the 1997 Torneo Descentralizado when was relegated to the Peruvian Segunda División.

In the 2004 Segunda División Peruana, the club was relegated to the Copa Perú.

Notable players

Honours

National
Peruvian Segunda División:
Winners (2): 1996, 2001
Runner-up (2): 1998, 2000

Regional
Liga Mayor de Fútbol de Lima:
Winners (1): 1991

Liga Provincial de Lima:
Winners (1): 1991

See also
List of football clubs in Peru
Peruvian football league system

 

Football clubs in Peru
Association football clubs established in 1950